Jiexiang is a town in Ruili, Yunnan, China.

Etymology
The name of "Jiexiang" means gem street in Dai language.

Administrative division
As of 2021, the town is divided into four villages: 
Hesai
Shunha
Nuanbo
Eluo

History
After the establishment of the Communist State, in February 1955, Jiexiang District came under the jurisdiction of the 3rd District of Ruili County. It was renamed "Jiedong People's Commune" in October 1958 and reverted to its former name of Jiexiang District in 1960. During the Cultural Revolution, its name was changed to "Xiangyang People's Commune". It was incorporated as a township in 1986. In 2021, it was recognized as "a famous tourist town" in Yunnan by the Yunnan Provincial Department of Culture and Tourism. Yunnan provincial government approve revoking Jiexiang Township and establish Jiexiang Town on 11 August 2021.

Geography
The town is located in the southeastern Ruili and borders Myanmar in the southeast.

The Shweli River flows through the town.

Economy
The town's main industries is agriculture. The main crops are vegetables, tobacco, rubber, grapefruit, and dendrobium nobile.

The Ruili Huanshan Industrial Park sits in the town.

Demographics

In 2016, the local population was 17,836, including 1,642 Han (9.2%) and 16,106 Dai (91.3%).

Tourist attractions
The main attractions are the Mangyue Temple, Denghannong Temple, and the scenic spot of "one village, two countries".

Transportation
The town is the termination of China National Highway 556.

References

Bibliography
 
 

Divisions of Ruili